Bill Gunston  (1 March 1927 – 1 June 2013) was a British aviation and military author. He flew with Britain's Royal Air Force from 1945 to 1948, and after pilot training became a flying instructor. He spent most of his adult life doing research and writing on aircraft and aviation. He was the author of over 350 books and articles. His work included many books published by Salamander Books.

Early life
Born William Tudor Gunston in London on 1 March 1927, Gunston was educated at Pinner County Grammar School. In his spare time, he was Flight Sergeant in the school Air Training Corps squadron and, for several months, the London Philharmonic Orchestra's librarian.

Royal Air Force
Gunston joined the Royal Air Force in 1945 and went to University College, Durham on an RAF cadetship. In 1946 he moved to No 4 Flying Training School in Bulawayo, Southern Rhodesia to train as a pilot. / He later moved to No 5 Flying Training School at Thornhill were he continued training and then became an instructor flying the North American Harvard. He later flew the de Havilland Vampire F3 a single-seat jet fighter before he left the RAF in 1948.

Author and editor
Gunston attended the Northampton Engineering College until 1951 then he joined the staff of Flight International magazine, where, writing as "W.T.G.", he was appointed Technical Editor in April 1955. From 1969, he was part of the production team on the annual publication Jane's All the World's Aircraft, editing the 2015/16 edition. He was editor of Jane's Aero-Engines from 1995 to 2007.

Family life and death
Gunston married Margaret who had been his secretary and they had two daughters.  He died on 1 June 2013.

Honours and awards
1 January 1996, Bill Gunston was appointed Officer of the Order of the British Empire for services to aviation journalism.

Books
 Plane Speaking, Patrick Stephens Ltd., 1991 
 Mikoyan MiG-21, Osprey, 1986 
 The Illustrated Encyclopedia of the World's Modern Military Aircraft 
 The Illustrated Encyclopedia of the World's Rockets and Missiles 
 Modern Air Combat, 1988 
 Soviet Air Power
 The US War Machine
 Submarines in Colour, Blandford Colour Series. Blandford, 1976 
 Modern Fighting Aircraft 
 The Illustrated Directory of Fighting Aircraft of World War II 
 Fighter! A Pictorial History of International Fighter Aircraft, Bristol: Parragon, 1997. .
 Fighters of the Fifties, Specialty Press, 1981 
 Early Supersonic Fighters of the West London: Ian Allan Ltd., 1973. .
 Bombers of the West. London: Ian Allan Ltd., 1973. .
 The Encyclopedia of the World's Combat Aircraft. New York: Chartwell Books, Inc., 1976. .
 The Encyclopedia of the World's Airpower. Consultant Editor. New York, New York: Crown Publishers, 1979. 
 Faster Than Sound: The Story of Supersonic Flight. London: Haynes, 1992. .
 Attack Aircraft of the West London: Ian Allan Ltd., 1974. .
 An Illustrated Guide to Allied Fighters of World War II. London: Salamander Books Ltd, 1981. .
 An Illustrated Guide to Military Helicopters, London: Salamander Books Ltd, 1981. .
 An Illustrated Guide to the Israeli Air Force, London: Salamander Books Ltd, 1982. .
 An Illustrated Guide to Future Fighters and Combat Aircraft, London: Salamander Books Ltd, 1984. .
 Hitler's Luftwaffe: A Pictorial history and technical encyclopedia of Hitler's air power in World War II, London: Salamander Books Ltd, 1977. 
 
 
 
 
 Development of Piston Aero Engines, Patrick Stephens Ltd, 1993,

See also
 John W. R. Taylor

Notes

References
Jane's Information Group

External links
"The Supersonic Turbojet" a 1956 Flight article by Bill Gunston
Search OBE at London Gazette
OBE History

1927 births
2013 deaths
Aviation writers
Aviation historians
British aviation historians
British historians
Alumni of University College, Durham
British military writers
English aviators
Fellows of the Royal Aeronautical Society
Officers of the Order of the British Empire